From a Basement on the Hill is the sixth and final studio album by the American singer-songwriter Elliott Smith. Recorded from 2000 to 2003, and faced with multiple delays due to Smith's personal problems that resulted in his death, it was released posthumously in the UK and Europe on Domino on October 18, 2004, and in the US the following day on October 19, 2004, through record label ANTI-, almost a year after his death.

The album was initially planned as a double album, and was incomplete at the time of Smith's death. Many of the songs Smith intended for the album remained unfinished, in some cases lacking only vocals. Smith's family hired his former producer Rob Schnapf and ex-girlfriend Joanna Bolme to sort through and finish the batch of over thirty songs that were recorded for the album, although the estate retained final decision on which tracks to include.

Many of the songs reference Smith's lifelong struggles with drug addiction and depression. His cause of death is officially unknown, as the coroner's report remarks that some aspects pointed to suicide and some to murder. The official nature of the case and statements from close friends state that his death is still under speculation. It has not been investigated further.

From a Basement on the Hill became Smith's highest-charting album in the US and was praised by critics, with reviewers complimenting the album's attempts to expand Smith's sound, such as the incorporation of instrumental passages, as well as heavier, guitar-based material.

Background 

On October 21, 2003, Elliott Smith died of two stab wounds, presumed by many to be self-inflicted. The wounds occurred following a heated argument at the Los Angeles home of his girlfriend, Jennifer Chiba. The coroner's determination was that the mode of death was undetermined and raised the possibility of homicide.

Smith battled heavy drug addiction and severe depression for most of his life, although he was sober in his final days, seeking treatment at the Neurotransmitter Restoration Center in Beverly Hills and even giving up alcohol, caffeine, red meat, refined sugars and most of his prescribed psychiatric medications on his 34th birthday. Smith took to sobriety with the same intensity with which he took to intoxication, and he found himself suddenly face-to-face with a lifetime of depression and unmanaged emotional trauma.

Recording and production 

The album was initially planned as a double album, due to contractual obligations with the DreamWorks label (now Interscope). Smith had over fifty songs on tape reel or digital hard drive. He completed mixing on nine of these tracks with several others lacking only minor revisions or final vocals. Smith's estate hired Schnapf and Bolme to complete mixing on these tracks and eventually chose fifteen for inclusion on the album, which was ultimately released on ANTI- label. During the recording period for the album, Smith had recorded with Steven Drozd and Russell Simins, drummers for The Flaming Lips and Jon Spencer Blues Explosion, respectively.

Following Smith's death, Rob Schnapf, producer of Smith's earlier albums Either/Or, XO and Figure 8, was hired to mix and produce the album, along with Smith's former girlfriend Joanna Bolme. David McConnell, although present throughout much of the actual recording process, was not consulted during the mixing, nor was he asked for the extensive three years' worth of notes he and Smith had made while the album was being recorded. When asked why he personally took up the job of finishing the album, Schnapf stated, "I had a paternal, protective feeling. I didn't want anybody mucking it up."

Content 

"Coast to Coast" features poetry by Nelson Gary. Smith told Under the Radar in 2003: "I asked this friend of mine to make up something he could say as fast as he could in fifteen minutes about people healing themselves or being unable to heal themselves. While he's saying this thing there is a main vocal that goes over that." The lyric "You're keeping me around, until I finally drag us both down" details a dysfunctional relationship.

"Pretty (Ugly Before)" was previously released as a single in August 2003 on Suicide Squeeze Records, along with a different version of "A Distorted Reality Is Now a Necessity to Be Free". According to McConnell, Smith did not intend to have "Pretty (Ugly Before)" on the album.

In "King's Crossing", where he sings "It's Christmas time and the needle's on the tree, the skinny Santa is bringing something to me", Smith alludes to using heroin, which he had many problems with.

The lyrics also contain references to the practice of a  Circuit rider (religious), the Liberty Bell, The Dalles, Oregon and Lite-Brite toys.

Schnapf noted that the track "Ostrich & Chirping", a short instrumental made from sampling and looping the noises made by a toy bird, had nothing to do with Smith and was something that McConnell had recorded by himself. McConnell said "don't ask me how this ended up on the record, I totally forgot I had put that on one of his reels."

Release 

From a Basement on the Hill was released on October 19, 2004, almost a year after Smith's death, through record label ANTI-, a sub-label of Epitaph.

It debuted at No. 19 in the US, selling 43,000 copies, giving him his best first week sales, and making it his highest-charting album in the US to date. The album has also been re-released by Kill Rock Stars, alongside a remastered reissue of his 1994 debut, Roman Candle.

When asked what Smith would have thought of the album, McConnell told Benjamin Nugent, "I don't think he would have delivered [that] record. The record he would have delivered would have had more songs, would have had different mixes and [been] a little more in-your-face." Schnapf also expressed that the final result that he and Bolme had produced was not the album that Smith would have made, simply because Elliott was not around to finish the album. Bolme also said that they did not add anything to the songs, and only mixed whatever had been recorded: "I would never presume to add anything. We didn't add anything."

Reception 

After his death and the release of From a Basement on the Hill, many critics and fans viewed the album as a suicide note. Sindri Eldon, a journalist for Reykjavík Grapevine wrote, "...the foreshadowing of his suicide is so strong that it's difficult to listen to."

From a Basement on the Hill was well received by critics. On music review aggregator website Metacritic, the album holds an approval rating of 88 out of 100 based on 37 reviews, indicating "universal acclaim." It is one of the site's all-time highest-rated albums. Many reviewers complimented the album's attempts to expand Smith's sound, such as the incorporation of instrumental passages, as well as heavier, guitar-based material.

Pitchfork called it "perfectly coherent and cohesive, without any sense of being slapped together from half-finished parts." E! Online called it "a beautiful swansong to one of this generation's best." Filter called it "large and epic, but tense and claustrophobic as well, and, gratefully, it's as close to Elliott as we've ever been." Billboard stated that "Smith bundles together subtlety and ferocity to create one of his heart-aching best... Consider it a 'fond farewell' to one of this generations most poignant and gifted songwriters." Rolling Stone had some reservations, observing that "this is an album about the seductions of oblivion, and a few of the more densely arranged songs mimic the characters in the lyrics, stumbing around without quite connecting. More often though, Smith teases extraordinary wit and warmth from songs that float lazily toward happiness."

In the UK the album was received even more enthusiastically than in Smith's home country. Q wrote, "Given that its backstory involves one of the grimmest deaths in music history, it's tempting to view this album darkly, but really, there's no denying the new twist here... Without wanting to second-guess his mindset, this music often sounds like the madness surrounding its creator – his heroin troubles, an allegedly turbulent relationship, his struggles against depression. So what dominates are these loud, wayward Los Angeles epics full of gothic grandeur, broken-glass emotions, bizarre soundscapes and heavy, early-'70s guitars." The review concluded, "All posthumous releases receive garlands of praise but this would take your breath away whatever the circumstances".

Other critics, however, were cautious about viewing the album as a suicide note: Mojo felt that "to do so would be to miss the crucial point – that From a Basement on the Hill is of a piece within a body of work that stretches back to the mid-'90s. If Smith's lyrical themes were pretty much constant, the point was only underlined by the survival of his abiding aesthetic. In very crude terms, he took the spirit of such White Album songs as "Long, Long, Long", "Julia" and "While My Guitar Gently Weeps", and re-rooted them in a lovelorn, druggy demi-monde... Smith, however, was no mere pasticheur. As ever, his chord changes and arrangements betray an inventiveness seemingly borne of brilliant instinct. Moreover, the songs that form this album's spine find him striding away, not only from his own influences, but the approach that had defined his last couple of records. Those who found Figure 8 and parts of XO too in thrall to the musical ways of the West Coast – slightly over-airbrushed, maybe a little too lush – will be cheered by the fractured, frankly grungey likes of "Don't Go Down" and "Coast to Coast": in their own controlled way, as messy and imperfect as the experiences described therein. The contrast between their music and Smith's ever-tender vocals makes for a compelling tension; here, he alights upon an approach that would have gone on to serve him admirably well." NME observed that the opening track "Coast to Coast" "sets out the themes which run through the whole album: chronic self-doubt, poisonous sarcasm, a prevailing sense of having had enough of trying to fulfil other people's expectations", and went on to state that "while this is clearly not the record Smith intended to make, it's still an immensely gripping and cohesive piece of work. For all his experiments with grungier rock and spectral acoustics, From a Basement... holds together convincingly. It sounds like a completely finished album, and one which, remarkably, is a match for the very best in Smith's catalogue."

Track listing

Personnel 

 Elliott Smith – all instruments not listed below, production, recording, front cover handwriting

 Additional personnel

 Steven Drozd – drums on "Coast to Coast"
 Aaron Sperske – drums on "Coast to Coast"
 Nelson Gary – poetry reading on "Coast to Coast"
 Sam Coomes – bass guitar and backing vocals on "Pretty (Ugly Before)"
 Aaron Embry – keyboards on "Pretty (Ugly Before)"
 Scott McPherson – drums on "Pretty (Ugly Before)"
 Fritz Michaud –  drums on "King's Crossing"

 Technical

 Autumn DeWilde – sleeve typography
 Joanna Bolme – mixing
 Rob Schnapf – mixing
 Scott Wiley – engineering assistance
 Ted Jensen – mastering
 Andrew Beckman – recording (additional)
 Chris Chandler – recording (additional)
 David McConnell – recording (additional)
 Dee Robb – recording (additional)
 Fritz Michaud – recording (additional)
 Jon Brion – recording (additional)
 Matthew Ellard – recording (additional)
 Pete Magdaleno – recording (additional)
 Ryan Castle – recording (additional)
 Tom Biller – recording (additional)
 Valente Torres – recording (additional)
 Nick Pritchard – sleeve design
 Renaud Monfourny – front cover photograph
 Ashley Welch – sleeve photography
 Dominic DiSaia – sleeve photography
 Paul Heartfield – sleeve photography

Chart positions

References

External links 
 

2004 albums
Elliott Smith albums
Anti- (record label) albums
Domino Recording Company albums
Albums published posthumously
Albums produced by Rob Schnapf